Mangelia horneana is a species of sea snail, a marine gastropod mollusk in the family Mangeliidae.

Description

Distribution
This marine species occurs off Yemen and Aden and in the Persian Gulf.

References

 Glayzer, B.A., Glayzer, D.T. & Smythe, K.R., 1984. The marine mollusca of Kuwait, Arabian Gulf . J. Conch., 31:311–330

External links
 
  Tucker, J.K. 2004 Catalog of recent and fossil turrids (Mollusca: Gastropoda). Zootaxa 682:1–1295.

horneana
Gastropods described in 1884